Nicola Rosini Di Santi (born in 1959 in Santeramo in Colle, Italy) is a French sculptor and painter.

Biography 
At the age of ten, Di Santi discovered the workshop of the famous sculptor from Argentina Hugo Demarco, in Paris. Currently, he stays and works at Montauroux in Provence, near Cannes. Since 2009 he has created more than 100 paints based on recycled tires.

Shows 
 1985: Paris – Gallery Sistu
 1986: Paris – Gallery Varnier
 1987: Paris – " Les fondeurs et leurs Sculpteurs " – Grand Palais, May 1987 show
 1988: Paris – Gallery Carpentier – Figuration Critique –  Rubens big from for sculpture
 1989: Spain – Art festival of Las Palmas
Paris – autumn Paris show – Prix des sciences humanistes
 1990–1991: Italy – Carrare Sculpture " L’âme de fond »
Paris – Goya big Prize
 1992: Beaulieu-sur-Mer – Art festival
Aix-en-Provence – Seigneurs des Arts
 1993: Paris – Gallery Carpentier
Mougins – Gallery Lézard
 1995: Montauroux – Exposition collective
Roquebrune-sur-Argens – Water skiing world championship trophy
Saint-Tropez – Gallery Chantal Nobel – Niou Largue
Paris – Gallery Carpentier
Nice – Gallery Lézard – Callian- Chapelle des pénitents
 1996: Saint-Tropez – Château de la Mésardiere
Paris – Gallery Carpentier
 1997: Mougins – " L’art dans la rue »
Villepinte – Maison et Objets annual show
 1998: Villepinte – Maison et Objets annual show
Monaco – L’art de la décoration
Auteuil – Maison 98
 1999: Auteuil – L’art de la maison
Saint-Jean-Cap-Ferrat – Expo personnelle
 2000: Monaco – Gallery Riccadonna
Saint-Tropez – Château de la Messardière
Donation to the Principality of Monaco of the sculpture " L’âme de fond ".
 2001: Paris – Opera Gallery
New York City – Opera Gallery
Singapore – Opera Gallery
Saint-Tropez – Château de la Messardière
 2002: Monaco – Gallery Riccadonna
Japan – Tokyo Bunkamura – Tokyo Gallery Museum – Tenjin Salaria event Fukuoka space – Loft Gallery Muséum Nogoya – Red brick wearhouse Gallery Yokohama
 2003: Miami – Opera Gallery
 2005: Singapore – Opera Gallery
 2006: London – Opera Gallery
 2006: Hong Kong – Opera Gallery
 2007: Venice – Opera Gallery
Suisse –  Espace Bétemps
 2008: Singapore – Opera Gallery
 2009: Paris – Opera Gallery
 2010: Monaco – Opera Gallery
 2011: Cannes – Hôtel Gray d'Albion
 2011: Saint-Tropez – Château de la Messardière
 2012: Cannes – Hôtel Gray d'Albion
Dubai –  Opera Gallery

Publications 
 Nicola Rosini Di Santi, Opera Gallery edition, Paris, 2004, 130 pages, 90 photos

References

External links
 Opera Gallery Website
  Site des Galeries Opéra
  Site de l'artiste
  Inauguration de trois œuvres à Grasse le 28 janvier 2008
  Interview sur France 2 le 9 avril 2009
  Article du webzine Italie à Paris
  Galerie Art Emotion Lausanne – Suisse
  Reportage photo expo à Cannes

Painters from Paris
20th-century French painters
20th-century French male artists
French male painters
21st-century French painters
21st-century French male artists
Modern sculptors
Modern painters
People from Bari
1959 births
Living people
20th-century French sculptors
French male sculptors